Kaathil Oru Kinnaaram is a 1996 Indian Malayalam comedy film, directed by Mohan Kupleri and produced by Sargams. The film stars Jagadish, Jagathy Sreekumar, Prem Kumar, Thilakan and Kalpana in the lead roles. The film has musical score by S. P. Venkatesh.

Plot
Hari and Varsha are in love but they cannot marry because her elder sister Megha is not willing to get married and also has some astrology issues. They find Mahesh, with similar issues to marry her, but Megha rejects him. Megha gets attacked by her ex boyfriend Ajith and she reveals that she was cheated by him in the past. That is the reason why she didn’t want to get married but now changes her mind. Megha’s father rejects this proposal. Hari and his friends make various plans to solve these issue and this forms the rest of the movie.

Cast

Soundtrack
The music was composed by S. P. Venkatesh.

References

External links
 

1996 films
1990s Malayalam-language films
Films directed by Mohan Kupleri